Shaved ice is a large family of ice-based desserts made of fine shavings of ice or finely crushed ice and sweet condiments or syrups. Usually, the syrup is added after the ice has been frozen and shaved—typically at the point of sale; however, flavoring can also be added before freezing. The dessert is consumed worldwide in various forms and ways. Shaved ice can also be mixed with large quantities of liquid to produce shaved ice drinks.

Many shaved ices are confused with "Italian ice", which is derived from the similar Italian dessert known as "granita". However, Italian ice, also known as "water ice", often has the flavoring (fruit juice or other ingredients, like almond) incorporated into the sugared water before it is frozen. Shaved ice—especially highly commercial shaved ice (such as that found in food chains or from street vendors)—is often flavored after the ice has been frozen and shaved. Snow cones are an example of shaved ice that is flavored after production.

History 

The use of stored and gathered ice for use in confections has been documented in Ancient Persia since 400 BCE onward.

In imperial Japan, the dessert was also a treat reserved for royalty, as it was made of natural ice formed during the coldest period of winter, which was stored in icehouses. This made it very rare, and a supreme luxury available only to Heian period nobles; ordinary people could not afford it.  is believed to be a Filipino indigenized version of the Japanese  class of desserts, originating from pre-war Japanese migrants into the Philippine islands. Over the years, more native ingredients were added, resulting in the development of the modern . As Japanese people immigrated to Hawaii, they brought this tradition with them. Like Persia and Japan, warm areas in Hawaii are close enough to snow-capped mountains that snow can be brought into the warm areas without melting.

Regions 
Shave ice varieties can be found around the globe with Asia being a particularly popular region.

Americas 

North America and the Caribbean 

In Canada and most of the contiguous United States, shaved ice, commonly known as "Snow cones" or "Snowballs", consist of crushed or shaved ice topped with sweet fruit flavored syrup. Within the United States, several regional variations are prominent: New Orleans snowballs include a topping of fruit flavored syrup or a fruit-cream syrup mixture, and Baltimore snowballs frequently include a fruit flavored syrup and are then topped additionally with marshmallow cream. A Sno-ball is the New Orleans variant. It can be served with syrup, ice cream, condensed milk, and a variety of toppings.
In the United States Virgin Islands (the American islands of St. Croix, St. Thomas, St.John, Water Island located in the Caribbean) a similar desert is called "fraco" (pronounced fray-co) -- sometimes spelled "fraico".

In Cuba, as well as in many Cuban neighborhoods in the United States, shaved ice is known as  after the Spanish word  for hailstones. In Miami, granizados are often sold in conjunction with other frozen confections in ice cream trucks and stands throughout the city. A classic Cuban flavoring for granizados is anise, made from extracts of the star anise spice.
In the Dominican Republic and many Dominican neighborhoods, snow cones are called , with  being the Spanish word for "cold", or alternately called "Yun Yun".
In Hawaii, they are known as "Hawaiian shave ice" or just "Shave ice", and often resemble East Asian versions of shaved ice, with condensed milk, adzuki beans or mochi balls often added as toppings, while a scoop of vanilla ice cream is common at the bottom of the cone.
In Mexico, as well as in some Spanish-speaking communities of the Southwestern United States, Texas, and California, a finely shaved and syruped ice is called a "raspa", or "raspado". Raspados come in a wide range of fruit flavors and classic Mexican flavors, including leche (sweetened milk with cinnamon), picosito (lemon and chili powder), chamoy (fruits and chili sauce, known as chamoyada), cucumber, guanabana, guava, pistachio, and tamarind.
In most of Puerto Rico and many Puerto Rican neighborhoods, they are named "Piragua", because they are made in pyramid shapes and agua means water in Spanish. In western Puerto Rico towns such as Mayagüez, they are called "raspao". Most Puerto Rican snow cone vendors use street snow cone carts instead of fixed stands or kiosks. During the summer months in Puerto Rican neighborhoods, especially in New York City and Philadelphia, "piragua" carts are often found on the streets and attract many customers.

Central and South America 
In Bolivia they are known as "Shikashika", where the ice is collected from the nearby mountains
"Mermelada con hielo" (ice jam) is a local curiosity widely consumed in Rancagua, central Chile.
In Colombia, Panama, Nicaragua and Venezuela they are called "Raspados" or "Raspaos" and are also topped with condensed milk and fruit flavors, 

In Ecuador there are three versions. The ones sold at street carts and having ice which has been shaved manually with a handheld tool resembling a wood hand plane are called "raspados". The ones sold at street carts, having ice that has been frappéd with a manually actioned rotary machine (some sellers use the handheld shaver, instead) and, are topped with condensed milk are called "granizados". The "granizados" sold at stores are usually not topped and their ice is finely frappéd by an electrical machine and, for that reason, they will have more liquid even when just prepared. "Raspados" and "granizados" sold at streets are much cheaper than "granizados" sold at stores.
In El Salvador and other countries of the Region, they are known as "Minutas"
In Guatemala they are called "Granizada" and are topped with condensed milk and fruit.
In Guyana they are known as "Crush Ice" or "Snow Cone" and are topped with condensed milk.
In Peru they are known as "raspadilla" and is often confused with cremolada. It consists of ground ice which is thick and topped with juices of different flavors that can be combined. The most common flavors are pineapple and strawberry, but it can also be served with berry juice, passion fruit juice, and purple corn juice. In some cases, though uncommon, it can be topped with condensed milk or yogurt. It is very popular on the beaches during summertime, and is also sold in the towns and cities from carts scattered throughout streets and avenues. Some vendors grind the ice from a block with a device or spoon with a blade like razor at one end, others have the ice already ground and stored in a cooler. Raspadilla is prepared in a cup in front of the customer who then selects the flavor of juice to pour on top.
In Brazil they are known as "raspa-raspa'" or "raspadinha" and in some parts of the country as "Gelo ralado com groselha" (redcurrant). Vendors grind the ice from a block with a device or spoon with a blade like razor at one end. Common flavors, which can be combined, include strawberry, coconut, bubblegum, grape, mint, passion fruit and Tutti frutti.

Asia

East and Southeast Asia 

In East Asia, shaved ice desserts are not only flavoured with various types of syrup. It is also common to add solid ingredients such as red bean paste, jellies, canned fruits, jams, sweetened condensed milk, and many other types of sweetened foods to vary the textures of the ice dessert.
In Taiwanese cuisine it is known as "Tshuah-ping" (剉冰; Taiwanese Hokkien) or "Bàobīng" (刨冰; Mandarin Pinyin). There are many varieties in Taiwan. Some of them are topped with canned fruits, fruits syrup and condensed milk. Other variations can be found throughout CHION. Originated from China in the 7th century, Baobing is one of the oldest variants of shave ice treats. It is typically served in large portions with a variety of toppings. In Taiwan the dish also has a variation called xuehua bing (雪花冰), in which the ice is not made out of water but milk.
In Japan, the ice is known as "Kakigōri" (かき氷; かきごおり) and topped with fruit flavoured or plain syrup. Some shops provide colorful varieties by using two or more different syrups. To sweeten Kakigōri, condensed milk is often poured on top of it. During the hot summer months, kakigōri is sold virtually everywhere in Japan. Some coffee shops serve it with ice cream, dango and red bean paste. Convenience stores may also sell it already flavored and packaged similar to ice cream.
In Korea, the shaved ices are known as "Bingsu" (빙수). The variety topped with sweetened red beans is called pat-bingsu, with pat (팥) meaning "red bean". Toppings may also include fresh fruits, and soybean powder. The earliest forms of bingsu existed during the Joseon dynasty (1392–1897). The government records show that the officials shared the crushed ices topped with various fruits, which were distributed from the ancient Korean ice storage called seokbinggo (Korean: 석빙고). Many other varieties can be found throughout the country. One variety that has been very popular in Korea since 2014 is snow flower bingsu ("눈꽃빙수"). It is made of extremely finely-shaved ice where the texture resembles real snow flakes. Also, rather than using plain ice, milk is added to the ice so that the shaved ice has milky flavor.
 In Cambodia shaved ice known as Teuk Kork Chus (ទឹកកកឈូស), is usually served during the hot summer days and during Cambodian New Years. Tuk (ទឹក) translate to water, Kak (កក) translates to ice; and Chhous (ឈូស) translates to shaved. This dessert is served with a variety of fillings such as jelly, basil seeds, jackfruit, taro, red beans, and more. After the filling the shaved iced is then filled to the top, then customers can choose a choice of different colored syrups usually in green, red, or blue; and condensed milk will lastly layer the top of the shaved ice. 
In Malaysia and Singapore, it is known as "ais kacang", which consists of shaved ice topped with sweetened syrup of various colours and flavours, condensed and evaporated milk, and sometimes also durian pulp or vanilla ice cream. Beneath the ice sweetened red beans, canned fruit, attap seeds and grass jelly are usually added. Electric ice shavers are often used; though some vendors may use a hand blade to shave the ice in order to produce a rough texture. A variation of this would be Cendol which is shaved ice with sweet green-coloured glutinous rice noodles drizzled with palm sugar; it is usually accompanied with kidney beans and canned sweetcorn.
In Indonesia, it is known as "es campur", which is similar to the Malaysian/Singaporean ais kacang.
In the Philippines, it is known as Halo halo which consists of shaved ice topped with sweetened beans and fruits, creme caramel (leche flan), nata de coco and ice cream. Halo-halo is believed to be an indigenized version of the Japanese kakigori class of desserts, originating from pre-war Japanese migrants into the islands. The earliest versions were composed only of cooked red beans or mung beans in crushed ice with sugar and milk, a dessert known locally as "mongo-ya". Over the years, more native ingredients were added, resulting in the development of the modern halo-halo. Some authors specifically attribute it to the 1920s or 1930s Japanese migrants in the Quinta Market of Quiapo, Manila, due to its proximity to the now defunct Insular Ice Plant, which was the source of the city's ice supply. "Halo-halò" literally means "mix-mix" in Tagalog. Halo-Halo nowadays could have various toppings and can be differentiated by various Region in the Philippines. It is also found in mais con yelo. Also in the Philippines we could get a Skrumble, where shaved ice added by flavors and topped it milk and chocolate syrup.
In Thailand, this kind of cold dessert is popularly known as "namkhaeng sai" (น้ำแข็งไส). Namkhaeng sai is served with a variety of toppings including red beans, toddy palm seeds, sticky rice, jellies, and preserved fruits, most often coconut. Then red syrup and condensed milk is liberally poured on top of the shaved ice. In other Thai desserts, the mixings are at the bottom and shaved ice is scooped on top. There are between 20–30 varieties of mixings that can be eaten. Among them are young coconut that has been soaked in coconut milk, black sticky rice, chestnuts, sweetened taro, red beans, sarim (thin strands of rice flour that is chewy and slippery) and many more.

South Asia 

In South Asia, snow cones are enjoyed as a low-cost summer treat, often shaved by hand.
In India known as Gola or Chuski; flavored with sugar syrups, fruit flavors and several other regional flavors like rose, khus, or kala-khatta. It is often topped with condensed milk. A literal translation of "Ball of ice" is used in many parts of India: Barfacha Gola in Marathi, Barf ka Gola in Hindi, and Barf no Golo in Gujarati. A similar version of shaved Ice can be found in northern Kerala known as Ice Orathi.

In Pakistan it is often referred to as Gola ganda, and it is flavored with multiple sugar syrups. fruits, condensed milk, ice cream, nuts, rosewater, and many other toppings. It is a very popular and well known street food.

Middle East 

 In Israel shaved ice is known as 'Barad', which is Hebrew for hail (ברד), following the Spanish granizado. Sold year-long in kiosks on the streets and beaches, Barad, which is more of a slush drink than shaved ice, comes in multiple fruit flavors, the most common of which is grape.
 In Turkey, Bici Bici is the most known summer dessert. It is very light. Generally ices are brought from Toros Mountains to the city center. Starve, home-made syrup and optionally banana added.

Europe

In Italy, a variation is called Grattachecca in Rome, or Granita in Sicily.
In France this dessert is called .
In Spain they are called granizado and are served as a drink with lemon juice. 
In Britain the term snowball is sometimes used, however it refers to a different treat. The Slush is similar, though more for drinking than eating, and both are common in the UK. They are often served in the same places as ice creams.

Drinks 
When large quantities of liquids are added to shaved ice, shaved ice drinks are produced
Raspado – Mexican shaved ice drink
Sâm bổ lượng, South Chinese and Vietnamese shaved ice drink/soup with jellies and fruits
Cendol, South East Asian drink usually containing shaved ice

See also 

 Italian ice - water ice
 Maple taffy - a Quebec and New England treat of boiled maple sap poured on snow
 Slush / Slushie - a shaved ice drink
Icee - brand-name product 
Slurpee - brand name 
Slush Puppie - brand name 
 Snow cream - a cream or snow and dairy-based dessert

References

External links

Ice-based desserts